The 1965 Volta a Catalunya was the 45th edition of the Volta a Catalunya cycle race and was held from 12 September to 19 September 1965. The race started in Tortosa and finished in Barcelona. The race was won by Antonio Gómez del Moral.

General classification

References

1965
Volta
1965 in Spanish road cycling
September 1965 sports events in Europe